is a railway station in the city of  Noda, Chiba, Japan, operated by the private railway operator Tōbu Railway. The station is numbered "TD-13".

Lines

Station layout
The station consists of one island platform serving two tracks, connected to the station building by an underground passage.

Platforms

Adjacent stations

History
Kawama Station opened on October 1, 1930.

From 17 March 2012, station numbering was introduced on the Tobu Noda Line, with Kiwama Station becoming "TD-13".

Passenger statistics
In fiscal 2018, the station was used by an average of 17,328 passengers daily. The passenger figures for previous years are as shown below.

Surrounding area
Kiwama Post Office

See also
 List of railway stations in Japan

References

External links

  

Railway stations in Chiba Prefecture
Railway stations in Japan opened in 1930
Tobu Noda Line
Stations of Tobu Railway